Camping World Series can refer to the following NASCAR racing series:

Camping World Truck Series
K&N Pro Series East, formerly the Camping World Series East
K&N Pro Series West, formerly the Camping World Series West